A water district is a special district given the task of supplying water and sewer needs to a community. This term is commonly used in the United States.

See also 
 Irrigation district
 Drinking water supply and sanitation in the United States
 Fresh water supply district

References 

Water supply
Water and politics
Water management authorities